Strathcona County Transit provides local, commuter, and school bus services to the community of Sherwood Park, Alberta, Canada, which is east of Edmonton in Strathcona County. Transportation for elderly citizens and people with disabilities is provided by Mobility Bus within Sherwood Park and rural Strathcona County. Strathcona County is home to Alberta's first fleet of double-decker buses. It purchased 24 double-decker buses from 2010 to 2020 using a combination of municipal, provincial, and federal funding.

Services 
Expansion of local scheduled weekday services was introduced on August 5, 2008 to provide bus service to newer areas and all-day routes within neighbourhoods. Dial-a-bus service takes over from the regular routes in the evening after 7 p.m. and on weekends.

The transit system provides local bus service within Sherwood Park and express service to destinations like downtown Edmonton, Government Centre, University of Alberta, MacEwan University, Northern Alberta Institute of Technology, and the Bonnie Doon Shopping Centre.

Facilities

Bethel Transit Terminal 
Address: 650 Bethel Drive
Coordinates: 
Functions: park and ride, pass and ticket sales, heated waiting area

Ordze Transit Centre 
Address: 970 Ordze Road
Coordinates: 
Functions: park and ride, pass and ticket sales (limited to first working day of the month and last two working days of the month), heated waiting area

Administration and garage 
Address: 200 Streambank Avenue
Coordinates: 
Functions: main office, garage and vehicle maintenance

Current routes

Local routes 
420 – Bethel Transit Terminal, Millenium Place, Strathmoor Industrial, Millennium Place, Sherwood Business Park
430 – Bethel Transit Terminal, Palisades, ABJ, Emerald Hills, Summerwood, Davidson Creek, Lakeland Ridge, Cloverbar Ranch, Charlton Heights
431 – Bethel Transit Terminal, Charlton Heights, Cloverbar Ranch, Lakeland Ridge, Davidson Creek, Summerwood, Emerald Hills, ABJ, Palisades
432 – Bethel Transit Terminal, Summerwood
433 – Bethel Transit Terminal, Charlton Heights, Lakeland Ridge, Clarkdale Meadows, Davidson Creek
433A – Charlton Heights, Lakeland Ridge, Chelsea Heights, Clarkdale Meadows, Davidson Creek, ABJ – Peak hour route only
440 – Bethel Transit Terminal, Glen Allan, Craigavon, Heritage Hills
441 – Bethel Transit Terminal, Foxboro, Foxhaven, Regency Park, Ordze Transit Centre
442 – Bethel Transit Terminal, Sherwood Park Mall, Nottingham
443 – Bethel Transit Terminal, Glen Allan, Centre in the Park, Brentwood, Maplewood, Maplegrove, Sherwood Heights, Ordze Transit Centre
443A – Bethel Transit Terminal, Brentwood, Maplewood, Maplegrove, Sherwood Heights, Centre in the Park – Peak hours only
443B – Bethel Transit Terminal, Glen Allan, Oak Street – peak hours only
450 – Bethel Transit Terminal, Centre in the Park, Sherwood Park Mall, Oak Street
451 – Bethel Transit Terminal, Mills Haven, Broadmoor Centre, Woodbridge, Westboro, Village on the Lake, Ordze Transit Centre
451A – Bethel Transit Terminal, Woodbridge, Westboro, Village on the Lake
451B – Bethel Transit Terminal, Mills Haven, Broadmoor Centre

Commuter routes 
Ordze Transit Centre – 30 minute peak hour service – hourly midday service. Weekday service only*
401 – Ordze Transit Centre, Downtown Edmonton, MacEwan Downtown
403 – Ordze Transit Centre, Government Centre, MacEwan
404 – OrdzeTransit Centre, University of Alberta
Bethel Transit Terminal – 15 minute peak hour service – 30 minute midday service. Terminal open 7-days/week
411 – Bethel Transit Terminal, Edmonton City Centre, MacEwan
413 – Bethel Transit Terminal, Government Centre, MacEwan University, NAIT
414 – Bethel Transit Terminal, University of Alberta

Fleet 
As of 2019, the fleet consists 76 buses for conventional routes:

 52 Nova Bus LF Series
 24 Alexander Dennis Enviro 500

See also 
Fort Sask Transit
Edmonton Transit Service
Leduc Transit
St. Albert Transit

References

External links 
 History of Regional Transit at Edmonton, Alberta
 Route Map – effective August 5, 2008

Bus transport in Alberta
Transport in Strathcona County
Transit agencies in Alberta